Masato Sagawa (佐川眞人; born August 3, 1943, in Tokushima, Japan) is a Japanese scientist and entrepreneur, and the inventor of sintered permanent magnet NdFeB. 
Sagawa was awarded the Japan Prize in 2012 for inventing and developing the highest performing sintered Nd-Fe-B type permanent magnets and contributing to energy conservation.
Dr. Sagawa is the president of NDFEB Corporation at Kyoto, Japan.

Career 
The sintered NdFeB was initially conceived and developed by Sagawa when he was with Fujitsu Laboratories where he worked from 1972 to 1982. Without his supervisor's support for the new magnetic compound, Sagawa resigned in 1981, and then joined Sumitomo Special Metals. Within several months after joining Sumitomo Special Metals in 1982, the strongest sintered NdFeB magnet was developed. Dr. Sagawa presented the new discovery of NdFeB magnet during the Magnetism and Magnetic Materials Conference in Nov. 1983 in Pittsburgh, Pennsylvania. 

In 1988, Sagawa founded Intermetallics, a research and development company devoted to the development of neodymium magnets.  Dr. Sagawa founded NDFEB Corporation in 2012 and he is the president of NDFEB Corporation at Kyoto, Japan. In additional to receiving the Japan Prize in 2012, Dr. Sagawa is a co-recipient of IEEE Medal for Environmental and Safety Technologies" for contributions to the development of rare earth-iron-boron permanent magnets for use in high-efficiency motors, generators, and other devices” in 2022. 

Dr. Sagawa has worked on improving the NdFeB magnetic materials’ magnetic properties; with over 60 patents for his work related to NdFeB.The 2022 Queen Elizabeth Prize for Engineering was awarded to him for the discovery, development and global commercialisation of the neodymium-iron-boron (Nd-Fe-B) magnet, a novel and extremely strong magnet.

Major awards and honors 
1986 - James C. McGroddy Prize for New Materials
1990 - Asahi Prize
2012 - Japan Prize
2016 - Nagamori Award
2018 - NIMS Award 2018
2019 - Yildirim International Entrepreneurship Award from FLOGEN Star Outreach
2022 - IEEE Medal for Environmental and Safety Technologies
2022 - Queen Elizabeth Prize for Engineering

References

External links
Speech at Tohoku University on Jan 27, 2014
History of Rare Earth Magnets
2012 (28th) Japan Prize: Dr. Sagawa
2012 Japan Prize Commemorative Lectures : Dr. Sagawa
/ Laureates of the Japan Prize: Masato Sagawa, Dr. Eng.
/ Inventing the Sintered NdFeB Magnets
/ Japan Prize Press Room
/ Yildrim International Entrepreneurship Award 
/ Queen Elizabeth Prize for Engineering honours magnet pioneer

People from Tokushima Prefecture
1943 births
Living people
Japanese materials scientists
Kobe University alumni
Tohoku University alumni
Rare earth scientists